"Lucky in Love" is a song written and performed by English singer-songwriter Mick Jagger  released as the second single from his debut album, She's the Boss, in 1985. "Lucky in Love" was the seventh track on She's the Boss and was one of two tracks from She's the Boss included on Jagger's greatest hits album, The Very Best of Mick Jagger.  The single version of the song that was also released on video has been remixed considerably from the album version.  The single version of the song is 4:51 long.  It was a #38 hit on the Billboard Hot 100 charts that year.

Personnel
Mick Jagger – lead vocals and backing vocals
Jeff Beck – electric guitar
Robbie Shakespeare – bass
Wally Badarou  – synthesizers
Herbie Hancock – synthesizer and sampler
Guy Fletcher – synthesizer
Chuck Leavell – organ
Ray Cooper – percussion
Aïyb Dieng – water drums
Sly Dunbar – drums
Bernard Fowler – backing vocals

Production
Mick Jagger - producer
Bill Laswell/Material - producer
James Farber - engineer
Dave Jerden - engineer
Bill Scheniman - engineer
Peter Corriston - art direction, design
Erica Lennard - photography

Chart performance

References

External links 
 Single credits at Discogs

1985 singles
Mick Jagger songs
Songs written by Mick Jagger
1985 songs
Songs written by Carlos Alomar
CBS Records singles